Armas Laitinen (20 November 1891 – 23 December 1969) was a Finnish wrestler. He competed in the lightweight event at the 1912 Summer Olympics.

References

External links
 

1891 births
1969 deaths
Olympic wrestlers of Finland
Wrestlers at the 1912 Summer Olympics
Finnish male sport wrestlers
Sportspeople from Helsinki